Coneheads is a 1993 American science-fiction comedy film from Paramount Pictures, produced by Lorne Michaels, directed by Steve Barron, and starring Dan Aykroyd, Jane Curtin and Michelle Burke. The film is based on the NBC Saturday Night Live comedy sketches about aliens stranded on Earth, who have Anglicized their Remulakian surname to "Conehead". Michelle Burke took over the role played by Laraine Newman on SNL. The film also features roles and cameos by actors and comedians from SNL and other television series of the time.

Three years after the release of Coneheads, screenwriters Bonnie & Terry Turner and star Jane Curtin revisited the premise of aliens arriving on Earth and assimilating into American society with the TV show 3rd Rock from the Sun, with Curtin instead playing a human character.

Plot
Upon discovering a UFO in American airspace, the National Guard sends fighter jets to investigate, who fire on the unresponsive craft and cause it to crash into the Atlantic Ocean, near Manhattan. The aliens from the planet Remulak aboard, Beldar Clorhone and his "genetomate" Prymaat, survive and quickly adapt to the human lifestyle, despite their conspicuous conical-shaped heads and metallic-sounding voices. Assigned by Highmaster Mintot to be 'Fuel Survey Underlord of the Wilderness Planet at the end of the Noctolium Solar Chain', Beldar was ordered to conquer Earth in order to establish a "Protoid Refueling Station" for the Conehead navy. Beldar becomes an appliance repairman, and upon discovering his undocumented status, his boss Otto gets him a false identity from local gangsters, which quickly alerts the INS. Meanwhile, after the couple discover from fellow Remulakian Marlax Zanthstrom that a rescue vessel will not arrive for seven "Zurls" (approximately 16 years), Prymaat informs Beldar she is pregnant. Ambitious INS agent Gorman Sneedling and his sycophantic assistant Eli Turnbull unsuccessfully attempt to capture the couple.

Months later, Beldar has become a respected taxi driver, and the couple live in his boss, Khoudri's basement. After their daughter Connie's birth, they adopt the surname Conehead and buy a home and move to suburban Paramus, New Jersey, where Beldar opens a driving school. Meanwhile, Gorman terminates his pursuit of the Coneheads after getting a promotion, but a U.S. Senate inquiry, citing the heavy expense, demands the case be properly concluded.

The now-teenaged Connie, who has grown up among Earth's norms and culture, simply wants to fit in with her peers, though her father greatly objects, especially when she begins seeing auto mechanic Ronnie Bradford. This causes tension between Connie and Beldar, who strongly disapproves of Ronnie, even tearing the roof off of his car and threatening to kill him after a date goes too far but stops before intimacy. Despite this, Ronnie and Connie reconcile after talking. Meanwhile, Beldar is preoccupied with winning a golfing trophy at his country club, while Prymaat becomes concerned about Gladys Johnson, a driving student, flirting with her husband. Beldar rebuffs Gladys and assures Prymatt they are for each other.

Gorman and Eli track the Coneheads to their home, posing as Jehovah's Witnesses to enter. During the conversation, Prymaat discovers their communication device to Remulak is beeping and notifies Beldar that 'the Big Phone' has contacted him, causing him to promptly eject the two. He is then notified of their approaching rescue vessel.

At a costume party that night, Beldar wins the golfing trophy. After Connie is told of their imminent rescue, she returns home with Ronnie, where she almost consummates their relationship using her parents' "senso-rings". Beldar and Prymaat discover them, just as the INS arrives to arrest the Coneheads. Ronnie helps stall the INS while the rescue vessel arrives just in time, and Gorman and Eli are taken aboard with the Coneheads.

On Remulak, Beldar is welcomed home, presenting the Highmaster with various Earthly 'gifts', including Gorman and Eli as slaves. Initially satisfied with Beldar's accomplishments, Mintot notices that Beldar's sharp teeth have been capped (something Otto had advised Beldar to do to blend in), accuses him of treason and sentences him to fight the ferocious Garthok ("knarfle the Garthok"), greatly distressing Prymaat.

After the Garthok easily and gruesomely kills other criminals sentenced to fight it, Beldar uses his Earthly golfing skills to hit a rock into the Garthok's mouth, causing it to choke. The Highmaster pardons Beldar and honors Beldar's request to return to Earth and have Gorman as his slave. Mintot agrees and hires Eli as his personal assistant, who quickly acclimates to his new role. Departing for Earth with Prymaat, Connie, and Gorman in tow, Beldar soon prioritizes Connie's feelings over planetary conquest by quickly faking an Earth attack, ordering his invasion force to retreat and proceed to their secondary target in another part of the galaxy, while making it look like a superior weapon has destroyed his spaceship. For rescuing him, Gorman agrees to give the Coneheads Green Cards due to Beldar's marketable talent.

Ronnie arrives to take Connie to the prom. Beldar gives him 55 words of advice, and then uses a massive flash bulb arrangement on his home-built Polaroid camera to document the happy event. As Connie and a now-sunburned Ronnie depart, he and Prymaat review the oversized photo, saying, "Ah, memories. We will enjoy them".

Cast

Dan Aykroyd as Beldar Clorhone (later Conehead) / Donald R. DeCicco
Jane Curtin as Prymaat Clorhone (later Conehead) / Mary Margaret Rowney
Michelle Burke as Conjaab "Connie" Clorhone/Conehead
Danielle Aykroyd as 3 year old Connie
Michael McKean as INS Deputy Commissioner Gorman Sneedling, the main antagonist of the film
David Spade as INS Agent Eli Turnbull
Chris Farley as Ronnie Bradford
Sinbad as Otto
Michael Richards as Arnold 
Eddie Griffin as Raymond
Phil Hartman as Marlax Zanthstrom
Adam Sandler as Carmine Weiner
Mitchell Bobrow as Tanner
Jason Alexander as Larry Farber
Lisa Jane Persky as Lisa Farber
Dave Thomas as Highmaster Mintot
Laraine Newman as Laarta, Prymaat's sister, Marlax's wife and Connie's aunt 
Garrett Morris as Captain Orecruiser
Drew Carey as Manny Manson
Kevin Nealon as Kevin
Jan Hooks as Gladys Johnson
Parker Posey as Stephanie 
Joey Lauren Adams as Christina
Julia Sweeney as Principal Eva Sweeney
Ellen DeGeneres as Coach Rosa Scott
Tim Meadows as Condemned Conehead #1
Tom Davis as Condemned Conehead #2
Peter Aykroyd as Condemned Conehead #3
Jonathan Penner as Air Traffic captain
Whip Hubley as F-16 pilot
Mark Fulton (uncredited) as Toni
Jon Lovitz (uncredited) as Dr. Rudolph, dentist
Tom Arnold (uncredited) as Tommy

In addition to Jane Curtin appearing as a regular cast member, Jan Hooks, Phil Hartman, Julia Sweeney, Kevin Nealon, and Laraine Newman all appeared as guest stars on 3rd Rock from the Sun, which was created by Coneheads co-writers Bonnie & Terry Turner and featured a similar premise of aliens making efforts to assimilate into American society. Additionally, co-writer Terry Turner cameos in the film as the sketch artist that Sneedling describes Beldar to.

Production
Tom Davis, who created the characters on Saturday Night Live, wrote the first version of the screenplay. He was unhappy with choices made by the producers, including setting the Remulak scenes in a gladiators' arena, rather than the suburban environment that he envisioned.

While there are some differences, Coneheads mostly follows the same plot as in  the animated special that was created ten years earlier. Similarities include the Coneheads being stranded on Earth, Beldar working as an appliance repair man, and Connie dating an earthling named Ronnie. A couple of differences is that the film never explained why the Coneheads chose France, whereas the animated special had them emulating the appliance store owner, who said he is a second-generation American descended from French immigrants. The animated special had the Coneheads stranded on Earth indefinitely as a separatist galaxy prevented the Highmaster from sending a star cruiser.

The film mostly takes place in Paramus, New Jersey. Some scenes were filmed in New York City and the New Jersey towns of Jersey City and Wrightstown.

Reception
The film debuted at No. 6 on its opening weekend, while its domestic box office grossed $7,100,501. By the end of its domestic theatrical run, the film had grossed $21,274,717.

Coneheads received mostly negative reviews from critics. The review aggregator website Rotten Tomatoes gives the film a low score of 35%, based on 31 reviews with a consensus that reads, "Listless, crude, and overall uninspired, Coneheads offers further evidence that stretching an SNL sketch to feature length can be tougher than narfling a garthok." Roger Ebert gave the film  stars out of 4, describing Coneheads as "dismal, dreary and fairly desperate" and the actors as unable to overcome an uninspired screenplay. Janet Maslin of The New York Times said the film "has its dopey charms", and that it is suitable for people who found Wayne's World too demanding.

The Los Angeles Times called it "an unusually companionable jape; in this world it makes perfect sense that the Coneheads' friends and neighbors never really register that there's anything terribly different about them. They're all-American eccentricseven if they happen to come from the planet Remulak".

Audiences surveyed by CinemaScore gave the film a grade of "B+" on scale of A+ to F.

The film received some critical re-evaluation during the 2010s, with multiple writers noting its satirical take on an immigrant family experience and immigration enforcement (meant as an exaggeration of Reagan-era politics) became eerily politically relevant following the September 11 attacks.

Soundtrack

The soundtrack for Coneheads was released on July 20, 1993, by Warner Bros. Records. It features the songs "Tainted Love" by Soft Cell, "It's a Free World, Baby" by R.E.M. and "Soul to Squeeze" by the band Red Hot Chili Peppers which would go on to reach 22 on the US Billboard Hot 100. The album itself would peak at 162 on the US Billboard 200 chart.

Track listing

None of David Newman's score was included on the above album, but it was issued on a 2015 Intrada album paired with his scores for Talent for the Game and Itsy Bitsy Spider.

References

External links
 
 
 
 

1993 films
1990s science fiction comedy films
1990s satirical films
1993 comedy films
Alien invasions in films
American science fiction comedy films
American space adventure films
American satirical films
1990s English-language films
Fictional trios
Films scored by David Newman
Films directed by Steve Barron
Films produced by Lorne Michaels
Films with screenplays by Dan Aykroyd
Films with screenplays by Tom Davis (comedian)
Films with screenplays by Bonnie and Terry Turner
Films set in New Jersey
Films using stop-motion animation
Paramount Pictures films
Saturday Night Live films
Saturday Night Live in the 1990s
1990s American films